Collix rufipalpis is a South Asian moth in the family Geometridae. It was first described by George Hampson in 1907. It is found in India and Sri Lanka. It is synonymous with Philbalapteryx rufipalpis.

References

rufipalpis
Moths described in 1907
Moths of Asia
Moths of Sri Lanka
Taxa named by George Hampson